Duke Moore, (July 15, 1913 as James Moore – November 16, 1976), was an American actor who has the distinction of spending his entire on-screen career in productions by Ed Wood.

Between 1953 and 1970, Moore appeared in the following for Wood:

Crossroads of Laredo 
Final Curtain
Plan 9 from Outer Space (1957)
Night of the Ghouls (1958)
The Sinister Urge (1960)
Take it Out in Trade (1970)

Moore also received a posthumous addition to his oeuvre when outtake footage to Take it out in Trade was found in a projectionist's booth in a pornographic theater in California and subsequently released on video in "as is" form.  This footage can be seen in Take it Out in Trade: The Outtakes.

Duke died in Hollywood in 1976 of a heart attack.  He was 63.

External links

American male film actors
1913 births
1976 deaths
20th-century American male actors